Love You Two is a 2019 Philippine television drama romantic comedy series broadcast by GMA Network. Directed by Irene Emma Villamor, it stars Jennylyn Mercado and Gabby Concepcion. It premiered on April 22, 2019 on the network's Telebabad line up replacing TODA One I Love. The series concluded on September 13, 2019 with a total of 104 episodes. It was replaced by The Gift in its timeslot.

The series is streaming online on YouTube.

Premise
Sisters Raffy Batungbakal and Sam Batungbakal had a perfect relationship until they unintentionally fell in love with the same guy. Raffy recently broke up with her boyfriend, is overprotective of her sister especially when she found that her sister is dating a much older guy, Jake Reyes. Raffy will eventually see Jake's value and it is the reason why she will fall in love with him.

Cast and characters

Lead cast
 Jennylyn Mercado as Rafaella "Raffy" Batungbakal-Reyes
 Gabby Concepcion as Joaquin "Jake" Reyes Jr.

Supporting cast
 Solenn Heussaff as Lianne Martinez
 Shaira Diaz as Samantha "Sam" Batungbakal-Marquez 
 Sheena Halili as Janina "Nina" Solis
 Jerald Napoles as Harrison Ford Batungbakal
 Kiray Celis as Darling Innocencio-Batungbakal
 Nar Cabico as Miguel "Migs" Borromeo
 Yasser Marta as Edison Marquez
 Michelle Dee as Michaela "Mochi" Isidro
 Clint Bondad as Theo Hoffmann
 Freddie Webb as Joaquin "Jake" Reyes Sr.
 Madeleine Nicolas as Teresita Reyes
 Joshua Zamora as Sebastian "Baste" Reyes

Guest cast
 Shermaine Santiago as Jean
 Don Umali as Mandap
 Seth dela Cruz as Jay-R Batungbakal
 Elia Ilano as Yumi Batungbakal
 Ollie Espino as Albert
 Nova Villa as Gloria
 JC Tiuseco as Chris
 James Teng as Louie
 Caprice Cayetano as Alex Borromeo
 Shyr Valdez as Edna Marquez
 Lolli Mara as Pandora Martinez
 Renz Fernandez as Matt
 Andre Paras as Adonis
 Barbie Forteza as Venus
 Pauline Mendoza as Zora

Accolades

References

External links
 
 

2019 Philippine television series debuts
2019 Philippine television series endings
Filipino-language television shows
GMA Network drama series
Philippine romantic comedy television series
Television shows set in Manila